Omophlus lepturoides is a species of comb-clawed beetles belonging to the family Tenebrionidae subfamily Alleculinae.

Etymology
The Latin species name lepturoides derives from Leptura (genus of beetles in the family Cerambycidae) and eides, meaning similar.

Distribution and habitat

This species is present in Europe (Austria, Germany, Italy, Poland). It can also be found in Southeast Asia and Russia, from Ukraine to the Caucasus. These beetles inhabit heat and sunny areas.

Description
Head anh pronotum are black and rather hairy. Elytra are reddish-brown. Legs are black.

Biology
Adults can be found from April to June. They feed on inflorescences of many different plants, while the larvae feed on roots of various plants, also cultivated (especially potatoes, wheat and maize). They overwinter as larvae in the soil.

References

External links
 Kaefer der welt
 Alamy

Alleculinae
Beetles of Europe
Beetles described in 1787